Starter for Ten may refer to:

 A catchphrase from the Granada TV series University Challenge
 Starter for Ten (novel), a 2003 novel by David Nicholls
 Starter for 10 (film), the 2006 film adaptation of the above book